Freedom of the Press is a 1928 American silent mystery film directed by George Melford and starring Lewis Stone, Marceline Day and Malcolm McGregor.

When a newspaper owner is murdered, his son takes over his crusade against a corrupt politician with criminal associations.

Cast
 Lewis Stone as Daniel Steele  
 Marceline Day as June Westcott  
 Malcolm McGregor as Bill Ballard  
 Henry B. Walthall as John Ballard  
 Robert Emmett O'Connor as Boss Maloney  
 Tom Ricketts as Wicks  
 Hayden Stevenson as Callahan  
 Robert Ellis as Cyrus Hazlett 
 Boris Baronoff as Criminal  
 Morgan Thorpe as Organist  
 Evelyn Selbie as Italian Mother  
 Bernard Siegel as Italian Father  
 Wilson Benge as Butler

References

Bibliography
 Munden, Kenneth White. The American Film Institute Catalog of Motion Pictures Produced in the United States, Part 1. University of California Press, 1997.

External links

1928 films
1928 mystery films
American mystery films
Films directed by George Melford
American silent feature films
1920s English-language films
Universal Pictures films
American black-and-white films
1920s American films
Silent mystery films